Calliostoma bernardi is a species of sea snail, a marine gastropod mollusk in the family Calliostomatidae.

Distribution
This species occurs in the Pacific Ocean off Santa Catalina Island, California, U.S.

References

 McLean J.H. (1984) New species of Northeast Pacific archaeogastropods. The Veliger 26(3): 233-239
 Turgeon, D.D., et al. 1998. Common and scientific names of aquatic invertebrates of the United States and Canada. American Fisheries Society Special Publication 26 page(s): 61

External links
 To Encyclopedia of Life
 To ITIS
 To World Register of Marine Species

bernardi
Gastropods described in 1984